The first cabinet of Tunisian Head of Government Ali Laarayedh was presented on 8 March 2013. It was approved on 13 March 2013 by the Constituent Assembly of Tunisia. Laarayedh resigned on 9 January 2014. His successor, Mehdi Jomaa, took office on 29 January 2014.

Cabinet members 

The Laarayedh government consisted of the Prime Minister, three deputy prime ministers, 24 ministers and six state secretaries.

References

Tunisia, Cabinet
Cabinets established in 2013
2013 establishments in Tunisia
Cabinets disestablished in 2014
2014 disestablishments in Tunisia
2013 in Tunisian politics
2014 in Tunisian politics